Lorena Austin is an American politician and Democratic member of the Arizona House of Representatives elected to represent District 9 in 2022.

Early life & education
Austin is a fifth-generation Arizonan, and a native of Mesa, Arizona. She attended Mesa Community College, and received her degree from Arizona State University. Austin has worked as a project manager for the Maricopa County Community College District.

Elections
2022 Austin and Seth Blattman were unchallenged in the Democratic Primary, and they went on to defeat Republican nominees Kathy Pearce and Mary Ann Mendoza in the general election.

References

External links
 Biography at Ballotpedia

Democratic Party members of the Arizona House of Representatives
Living people
Year of birth missing (living people)
21st-century American women politicians
Politicians from Mesa, Arizona
Mesa Community College alumni